Beach Fossils is the debut album by American indie rock band Beach Fossils. The album was written, recorded, and produced entirely by frontman Dustin Payseur and was released on May 25, 2010, through Captured Tracks.

Background
After a brief stint at community college in North Carolina, Dustin Payseur moved to New York City in 2008 to pursue his interests in recording music. Known for distant, faded vocals, and lo-fi reverberating instrumentations, Payseur formed Beach Fossils in early 2009 as a vehicle of expansion for a solo project. That same year, bassist John Peña and guitarist Christopher Sennott Burke were recruited, followed by Zachary Cole Smith on drums.  After signing to Captured Tracks and quickly pulling together a live band, they took off playing countless shows across the U.S. gathering a slew of devoted fans in their wake. Their debut single, Daydream/Desert Sand was released in February 2010 through Captured Tracks.

On May 18, 2021 Beach Fossils announced via Instagram that they will be performing a livestream show of the band playing both Beach Fossils and What A Pleasure EP in their entirety. The livestream will be held on June 10, 2021, and coincides with the 11th anniversary of their debut album as well as the 10th anniversary of What A Pleasure.

Reception

Beach Fossils received generally positive reviews from critics. In a positive review, Ian Cohen of Pitchfork wrote "The way Payseur's vocals are masked with reverb brings to mind the early singles of the Clientele, while the interlocking musicianship bears a lot of similarity to their tourmates in Real Estate." However he went on to criticize its direction, writing "While Payseur has an ingenuity with melody, what keeps him from reaching the heights of those acts is a lack of true immersion... The mundanity of Beach Fossils can be deflating, and you don't catch much on the fifth listen that you didn't on the first."

Regarding its writing and style, John Caramanica of The New York Times said of the album "Stop me if you’ve heard this one before: one-man band makes hazy, but surprisingly sturdy, pop-influenced indie rock with mild seaside flourishes." He went on to compliment the album for creating a unique sound regardless of its minimal approach, "How this sort of music became a cliché in the space of just the past year or so speaks to the speed and density of the Internet. And yet the self-titled Beach Fossils debut, on Captured Tracks, manages to not feel overly 2009." Also commenting on Beach Fossils' familiar yet unique sound, Allmusic wrote "Payseur’s songs are instantly catchy and his voice betrays no smirkiness, just pure innocence. The focus and clarity of his playing and arrangement also give the record an originality that lets the record stand out from the hissing crowd."

Track listing
All songs written and recorded by Dustin Payseur except where noted.
"Sometimes" - 2:56
"Youth" - 2:37
"Vacation" - 3:46
"Lazy Day" - 3:05
"12 Roses" - 2:20
"Daydream" - 3:04
"Golden Age" - 4:46
"Window View" - 4:06
"The Horse" - 2:45
"Wide Awake" - 3:06
"Gathering" - 1:36

References

2010 debut albums
Beach Fossils albums
Captured Tracks albums